Joanna Tuffy (born 9 March 1965) is an Irish Labour Party politician who served as a Teachta Dála (TD) for the Dublin Mid-West constituency 2007 to 2016. She was a Senator for the Administrative Panel from 2002 to 2007.

Early life 
Born in London in 1965, Tuffy was educated at Trinity College Dublin (BA) and the Dublin Institute of Technology (Legal Studies).

Political career 
She was elected to South Dublin County Council for the Lucan area in 1999 and served until 2003. At the 2002 general election she unsuccessfully stood for election to Dáil Éireann for Dublin Mid-West. She was subsequently elected to the 22nd Seanad Éireann by the Administrative Panel. She was elected to Dáil Éireann for the first time at the 2007 general election.

Her father is Eamon Tuffy, a former Labour Party councillor for Lucan, he was co-opted to replace her in 2003.

Tuffy is a strong supporter of Israel and served as vice-chair of the Oireachtas Friends of Israel group.

She, along with TD Tommy Broughan, opposed Labour going into coalition with Fine Gael in the aftermath of the 2011 general election.

In September 2013, Tuffy publicly disagreed with the official Labour Party position supporting the abolition of the Seanad during the referendum campaign. She argued that it had played a key role in the past and could do so in the future.

Tuffy lost her seat at the 2016 general election.

She was re-elected to South Dublin County Council in the 2019 local elections. She contested the 2019 Dáil by-election in the Dublin Mid-West constituency, when she gained 6.7% of the first preference votes but was not elected. She was also an unsuccessful candidate for Dublin Mid-West at the 2020 general election, when her share of first preference votes fell to only 3.39%.

References

External links
Joanna Tuffy's page on the Labour Party website

 

1965 births
Living people
Alumni of Trinity College Dublin
Alumni of Dublin Institute of Technology
Irish solicitors
Labour Party (Ireland) TDs
Members of the 22nd Seanad
21st-century women members of Seanad Éireann
Members of the 30th Dáil
Members of the 31st Dáil
21st-century women Teachtaí Dála
Labour Party (Ireland) senators
Local councillors in South Dublin (county)
People from Lucan, Dublin